Spencer Holst (July 7, 1926 – November 23, 2001) was an American writer and storyteller. 

Though he published several collections of stories and volumes of translations, Holst was known primarily for the captivating live performances of his work that he regularly conducted, particularly in the New York City area, in a distinctive mellifluous, rhythmically cadenced voice.  In his heyday he was often heard on New York's listener-sponsored radio station, WBAI.

For many years until his death, he lived at Westbeth Artists Housing in NYC. In addition to presenting readings there, he exhibited his watercolour paintings, many based on invented calligraphic motifs. The paintings were often shown with lengthy titles attached, some were small stories in themselves.

The typical Holst story might be a gentle but twisted fable, such as the tale of a frog who, having become addicted to morphine during a laboratory experiment, was rejected by the woman whose kiss transformed him back into a prince because he was, after all, only a junkie.  Holst also wrote a number of paragraph-length prose pieces, which distilled a brief scene or anecdote into a glimmering, evanescent koan.

Selected works

Thirteen Essays / Sixty Drawings (1960) [Self Published] by Spencer Holst and drawings by Beatte Wheeler
On Demons (chapbook) (1970)
The Language of Cats and Other Stories (1971) 
Spencer Holst Stories (1976)  Winner of the Rosenthal Literary Award by the American Academy of Arts & Letters
Something to Read to Someone/16 Drawings (with Beate Wheeler) (1980) 
The Zebra Storyteller (1993)
Brilliant Silence (2000)

References

External links
 Spencer Holst archive at University of Texas, El Paso
 Searching for Spencer Holst by Wendy Freedman

20th-century American painters
American male painters
American performance artists
American short story writers
American storytellers
Radio personalities from New York City
1926 births
2001 deaths
Painters from New York City
20th-century American male artists